Dim (Bashkir and ) is a rural locality (a village) in Durasovsky Selsoviet, Chishminsky District, Bashkortostan, Russia. The population was 32 as of 2010. There is 1 street.

Geography 
Dim is located 27 km south of Chishmy (the district's administrative centre) by road. Novye Yabalakly is the nearest rural locality.

References 

Rural localities in Chishminsky District